Hendrik Jan Kooijman (born 17 January 1960 in Velsen, North Holland) is a former Dutch field hockey player, who earned a total number of 154 caps, scoring seven goals for the Netherlands national field hockey team in the 1980s and early 1990s. Playing club hockey for HC Bloemendaal, the defender was a member of the bronze medal-winning Dutch team at the 1988 Summer Olympics in Seoul.

References
  Dutch Olympic Committee
  KNHB Profile

External links
 

1960 births
Living people
Dutch male field hockey players
Olympic field hockey players of the Netherlands
Field hockey players at the 1988 Summer Olympics
Field hockey players at the 1992 Summer Olympics
Olympic bronze medalists for the Netherlands
People from Velsen
Olympic medalists in field hockey
Medalists at the 1988 Summer Olympics
HC Bloemendaal players
1990 Men's Hockey World Cup players
Sportspeople from North Holland
20th-century Dutch people